Thomas Bewes Strangways (23 July 1809 – 23 February 1859), generally called "Bewes Strangways" and "T. Bewes Strangways", was an explorer, early settler and Colonial Secretary of South Australia.

Strangways was the second son of late Henry Bull Strangways of Shapwick, Somerset, England. However, they never married and Strangways later married Lavinia Albina née Fowler (c. 1810 – 22 October 1883). He sat on the Street Naming Committee, where Strangways Terrace, located in North Adelaide was named after him.

In November 1837, Strangways, Young Bingham Hutchinson and a party explored the Fleurieu Peninsula and Lake Alexandrina region, searching for other outlets to the Southern Ocean. In the process, they "discovered" Currency Creek, which they named after the whale boat they were using, the Currency Lass.

He was the uncle of future South Australian Premier, Henry Strangways. Giles E. Strangways, (an associate of John Finnis and Charles Sturt in their pioneering cattle drive of 1838), was a brother.

Strangways was a member of the South Australian Legislative Council and Colonial Secretary from 22 August 1837 to 12 July 1838.

Strangways died in Glenelg, South Australia or St. Leonard's on 23 February 1859, aged 49.
His widow, an invalid, went to live with H. B. T. Strangways, then with Mrs. B. Clark at Childers Street, North Adelaide in an arrangement which has the appearance of protective custody. In 1865 her nephew, Mr. C. Fowler, a Miss Fowler, and a sister-in-law Mrs. Lorimer, sought a writ of habeas corpus against them, claiming that her family and friends had been denied access to her. As a result, Mrs. Strangways was taken in Rounsevell's carriage to Mr. Fowler's home "Elderslie" at Woodside, where she died some eighteen years later.

References

 

|-

1809 births
1859 deaths
Settlers of South Australia
Explorers of South Australia
Members of the South Australian Legislative Council
People from Sedgemoor (district)
19th-century Australian politicians